Cui Weiping (崔卫平) is a Beijing Film Academy professor and social critic. She was born in Jiangsu province. She is a famous scholar, professional translator and cultural critic.

References

External links

Cui weiping Twitter account(mainly Chinese)
Cui Weiping's blog (in Chinese)

Chinese film critics
Year of birth missing (living people)
Living people
People from Yancheng
Chinese scholars
Charter 08 signatories